Everything for the Company (German: Alles für die Firma) is a 1935 Austrian comedy film directed by Rudolf Meinert and starring Oskar Karlweis, Felix Bressart and Otto Wallburg. Many of those involved in the film's production had recently fled from Nazi Germany. It was shot at the Schönbrunn Studios in Vienna. The film's sets were designed by the art director Artur Berger. A separate Dutch version De Vier Mullers was also produced, directed by Meinert and starring Johannes Heesters.

Cast
 Oskar Karlweis as Otto Sonndorfer
 Felix Bressart as 	Philipp Sonndorfer
 Otto Wallburg as 	Emmerich Liebling
 Alfred Neugebauer as 	Max Sonndorfer
 Friedl Czepa as Dr. Hertha Becker
 Gretel Berndt as Daisy Rix
 Hermine Sterler as Ella Sonndorfer
 Fritz Imhoff as Hoffmann
 Annie Rosar as Frau Lasch		
 Viktor Staal

References

Bibliography 
 Dassanowsky, Robert. Screening Transcendence: Film Under Austrofascism and the Hollywood Hope, 1933–1938. Indiana University Press, 2018

External links 
 

1935 films
1935 comedy films
Austrian comedy films
1930s German-language films
Films directed by Rudolf Meinert
Austrian black-and-white films
Films shot at Schönbrunn Studios

de:Alles für die Firma (1935)